Pantheon Systems, Inc. is a privately held San Francisco-based corporation founded in 2010 by Zack Rosen, David Strauss, Josh Koenig, Matt Cheney. The company's flagship service, Pantheon, is a webops platform for open-source Drupal and WordPress websites. It is an app-specific PaaS provider, sold on a monthly subscription basis, with several support tiers available.

Technologically, Pantheon applications run as software-as-a-service instead of running on users' own servers. Pantheon's service is built on top of Google Cloud Platform.

Capitalisation 
 
Founded in 2010, Pantheon Systems, Inc. raised a $1.3 million seed round to start. They subsequently raised $5 million Series A financing from Foundry Group, with previous investors being Baseline Ventures, First Round Capital, Floodgate, and Founders Collective bringing the total amount to $6.3 million.

In 2014, Pantheon raised $21.5 million in Series B financing led by Scale Venture Partners (ScaleVP) with participation from OpenView Partners and existing investors Foundry Group and First Round Capital. As part of the funding round, Rory O'Driscoll, Partner at ScaleVP joined the board of directors.

In 2016, Pantheon announced that it has raised a $29 million Series C round. Investors in this round include previous investors Foundry Group, OpenView Investment Partners, and Scale Venture Partners, as well as new investor Industry Ventures, which put $8.5 million into this round. The new round follows Pantheon’s $21.5 million Series B round in 2014 and brings the company’s total funding to $57 million.

In 2019, Sageview Capital led a Series D funding round of $40 million, bringing total funding to over $100 million.

On July 13, 2021, WebOps platform Pantheon raises $100M from SoftBank Vision Fund. The $100 million Series E funding is at a valuation of over $1 billion.

Features 
 
Pantheon is a combination of web development tools in the cloud and web hosting and management services. It is based in the cloud, and the service is free for developers.
Developers have a choice between Drupal 7, Drupal 8, Drupal 9, WordPress and installation of profiles like Open Atrium. Data can be imported onto Pantheon automatically if the business has an existing Drupal-based website. Pantheon Multidev does for a company's website what software-defined data centers do for its infrastructure. Each member of a team can use all the services that power a site on demand, developing on a single platform. As a result, large websites launch faster and cost less to manage over time.
 
Based on Pantheon's multi-tenant containerized architecture, Multidev spins up in minutes, with no need for additional infrastructure or virtual servers.
 
Pantheon makes it easy to deploy different versions of a site on test servers and the live site, as well as backup servers.

References

External links 

 
 

Software companies based in the San Francisco Bay Area
Free software companies
Software companies of the United States
Web frameworks
Drupal
WordPress